Sir John Hanmer, 3rd Baronet (died August 1701) was a Welsh politician who sat in the House of Commons at various times between 1659 and 1690.

Hanmer was the son of Sir Thomas Hanmer, 2nd Baronet of Hanmer and his first wife Elizabeth Baker. In 1659, he was elected Member of Parliament for Flint in the Third Protectorate Parliament. He was knighted on 9 August 1660 and was High Sheriff of Gloucestershire from 1664 to 1665. 

In October 1669, he was elected MP for Evesham for the Cavalier Parliament. He succeeded to the Baronetcy on the death of his father in 1678. In 1681 he was elected MP for Flintshire. He was elected MP for Flint again in 1685. He became a colonel of the 11th Foot in 1688. In 1689 he was elected MP for Flint again. He became a major-general in the Army and was colonel of the 11th Foot, serving King William III at the Battle of the Boyne in 1690.

Hanmer married Mary Alston, daughter of Joseph Alston, of Netherhall, Suffolk. He died in 1701, probably killed in a duel and left no issue; he was succeeded in the baronetcy by his nephew Thomas, the son of his younger brother William who had already predeceased their father, the 2nd Baronet.

References

Year of birth missing
1701 deaths
Baronets in the Baronetage of England
Devonshire Regiment officers
Members of the Privy Council of Ireland
Members of the Parliament of England (pre-1707) for constituencies in Wales
High Sheriffs of Gloucestershire
Williamite military personnel of the Williamite War in Ireland
English MPs 1659
English MPs 1661–1679
English MPs 1681
English MPs 1685–1687
English MPs 1689–1690
English generals